Miquel's theorem is a result in geometry, named after Auguste Miquel, concerning the intersection of three circles, each drawn through one vertex of a triangle and two points on its adjacent sides. It is one of several results concerning circles in Euclidean geometry due to Miquel, whose work was published in Liouville's newly founded journal Journal de mathématiques pures et appliquées.

Formally, let ABC be a triangle, with arbitrary points A´, B´ and C´ on sides BC, AC, and AB respectively (or their extensions). Draw three circumcircles (Miquel's circles) to triangles AB´C´, A´BC´, and A´B´C. Miquel's theorem states that these circles intersect in a single point M, called the Miquel point. In addition, the three angles MA´B, MB´C and MC´A (green in the diagram) are all equal, as are the three supplementary angles MA´C, MB´A and MC´B.

The theorem (and its corollary) follow from the properties of cyclic quadrilaterals. Let the circumcircles of A'B'C and AB'C' meet at  Then  hence BA'MC' is cyclic as desired.

Pivot theorem

(In the diagram these points are labeled P, Q and R.)

If A´, B´ and C´ are collinear then the Miquel point is on the circumcircle of ∆ABC and conversely, if the Miquel point is on this circumcircle, then A´, B´ and C´ are on a line.

Trilinear coordinates of the Miquel point

If the fractional distances of A´, B´ and C´ along sides BC (a), CA (b) and AB (c) are  da, db and dc,  respectively, the Miquel point, in trilinear coordinates (x : y : z), is given by:

where da = 1 - da, etc.

In the case da = db = dc = ½ the Miquel point is the circumcentre .

A converse of Miquel's theorem
The theorem can be reversed to say: for three circles intersecting at M, a line can be drawn from any point A on one circle, through its intersection C´ with another to give B (at the second intersection). B is then similarly connected, via intersection at A´ of the second and third circles, giving point C. Points C, A and the remaining point of intersection, B´,  will then be collinear, and triangle ABC will always pass through the circle intersections A´, B´ and C´.

Similar inscribed triangle

If the inscribed triangle XYZ is similar to the reference triangle ABC, then the point M of concurrence of the three circles is fixed for all such XYZ.

Miquel and Steiner's quadrilateral theorem

The circumcircles of all four triangles of a complete quadrilateral meet at a point M. In the diagram above these are ∆ABF, ∆CDF, ∆ADE and ∆BCE.

This result was announced, in two lines, by Jakob Steiner in the 1827/1828 issue of Gergonne's Annales de Mathématiques, but a detailed proof was given by Miquel.

Miquel's pentagon theorem

Let ABCDE be a convex pentagon. Extend all sides until they meet in five points F,G,H,I,K and draw the circumcircles of the five triangles CFD, DGE, EHA, AIB and BKC. Then the second intersection points (other than A,B,C,D,E), namely the new points M,N,P,R and Q are concyclic (lie on a circle). See diagram.

The converse result is known as the Five circles theorem.

Miquel's six circle theorem

Given points, A, B, C, and D on a circle, and circles passing through each adjacent pair of points, the alternate intersections of these four circles at W, X, Y and Z then lie on a common circle. This is known as the six circles theorem. It is also known as the four circles theorem and while generally attributed to Jakob Steiner the only known published proof was given by Miquel. David G. Wells refers to this as Miquel's theorem'.

Three-dimensional version of Miquel's theorem

There is also a three-dimensional analog, in which the four spheres passing through a point of a tetrahedron and points on the edges of the tetrahedron intersect in a common point.

See also
 Clifford's circle theorems
 Bundle theorem
 Miquel configuration

Notes

References

External links

 
 
 
 
 Miquels' Theorem as a special case of a generalization of Napoleon's Theorem at Dynamic Geometry Sketches

Theorems about triangles and circles